Shaul Reuven Foguel was an Israeli mathematician (December 5, 1931 - December 19, 2020). Shaul Foguel was born to one of the founding families of the City of Tel Aviv and his mother Dora Malkin was a direct descendant of Saul Wahl. He received his B.S. and M.S. in Mathematics from the Hebrew University of Jerusalem and his PhD in Mathematics from Yale University in 1958. He wrote his dissertation under Nelson Dunford on "Studies in Spectral Operators and the Basis Problem". Shaul Foguel was Professor Emeritus of the Hebrew University of Jerusalem, and a supporter of the Israeli Left. He ran in the 1969 Knesset elections on the Peace List along with Gadi Yatziv, although it failed to win a seat. He spent his retirement in New York City, where his two sons, Professor Tuval Foguel of Adelphi University, and Sy Foguel, the CEO of Berkshire Hathaway GUARD Insurance Companies live.

Publications
 Shaul R. Foguel "Selected topics in the study of Markov operators" Dept. of Mathematics, University of North Carolina at Chapel Hill, 1980
 Shaul R. Foguel "The Ergodic theory of Markov processes" Van Nostrand Reinhold Co., 1969

Selected articles

References

Academic staff of the Hebrew University of Jerusalem
Israeli mathematicians
Yale Graduate School of Arts and Sciences alumni
Einstein Institute of Mathematics alumni
1931 births
2020 deaths